Wellington is a rural municipality in Prince Edward Island, Canada. It is located in Prince County, and extends as Wellington Centre onto Route 2 from Richmond through to St. Nicholas.

Located in the "Evangeline Region", a cluster of Acadian communities in the central part of Prince County, Wellington is served by Route 2, and until 1989 was served by the Prince Edward Island Railway. Wellington is home to the head office of Collège Acadie Î.-P.-É.

Demographics 

References 

Communities in Prince County, Prince Edward Island
Rural municipalities in Prince Edward Island